Tommaso Realfonso (c. 1677 in Naples – after 1743)  was an Italian painter of the 18th century, specializing studies of still-life paintings of flower and fruit pieces. He also painted vedute or landscapes.

He was also called ‘’Masillo’’ by his Andrea Belvedere, his master, in whose studio he worked till 1694, when Belvedere moved to Spain.  A still-life attributed to Realfonso is found in the Museo Correale in Sorrento.

References

18th-century Italian painters
Italian male painters
Italian still life painters
Italian Baroque painters
Painters from Naples
1677 births
18th-century Italian male artists